Kadaladu Vadaladu is a 1969 Indian Telugu-language swashbuckler film, produced by K. Seetharama Swamy and G. Subba Rao and directed by B. Vittalacharya. It stars N. T. Rama Rao and J. Jayalalithaa. The film revolves around the efforts of a prince to prove the innocence of his wrongfully convicted mother. It was released on 9 July 1969 and became a success.

Plot 
Anangapala Maharaju, the king of Avanti, has two wives: Vinutha Devi and Saritha Devi. Vikram is the son of the first wife, Vinutha Devi, who is the future heir. On the occasion of his birthday, someone tries to assassinate him, but he is protected by Chief Commander Veerasena. The attempted assassination was made by Mahamantri Charuvakudu, Deputy Commander Dindimavarma and Bhujangam (Saritha Devi's brother) who are trying to capture the kingdom. Saritha Devi also joins forces with them to make her son Vinoda Varma a king. In that process, they create an illusion to the king's eyes and prove that Vinutha Devi has an illicit relationship with Veerasena. The king orders the death sentence to both of them, but to prove their innocence, Veerasena escapes along with Vinutha Devi and Vikram.

Years roll by, Vikram learns regarding the past. Now he decides to remove the black mark on his mother, so, he reaches the fort, gets the appreciation of the King and joins as his bodyguard. In the fort, he gets the acquaintance with Madhumathi, daughter of Bhujangam and both fall in love. Meanwhile, Kiriti, son of Charuvakudu develops an animosity towards Vikram, so, he makes a plot by killing Vinoda Varma and puts the blame on him. Vikram is stood as a murderer in the court when Vinutha Devi reaches there, the King recognises and blames her as impure. Listening to it, Vikram bursts out making a challenge that he will prove his mother's innocence and escapes along with his mother. There onwards, Vikram chases the baddies like a shadow in different attires of disguise by the name Kadaladu Vadaladu. He teases and puts conflicts between them and brings out the truth. Finally, Vikram eliminates all the baddies and the film ends with the marriage of Vikram and Madhumathi.

Cast 
N. T. Rama Rao as Vikrama Simha
J. Jayalalithaa as Madhumathi
Satyanarayana as Kiriti
Ramakrishna as Vinoda Varma
Mikkilineni as Veerasenudu
Dhulipala as Anagapala Maharaju
Mukkamala as Mahamantri Charuvakudu
S. V. Ramadasu as Bhujanga Rayulu
Tyagaraju as Dindima Varma
Vijaya Lalitha as Sukanya Devi
Hemalatha as Vinutha Devi
Chayadevi as Saritha Devi
Balakrishna as Gajapathi

Production 
After the success of 1967's Chikkadu Dorakadu, its director B. Vittalacharya announced his next film to be Kadaladu Vadaladu, a title he developed in a "jiffy". The film was produced by K. Seetharama Swamy and G. Subba Rao of Sri Lakshmi Narayana Combines, and written by Veeturi. Cinematography was handled by H. S. Venu, and editing by K. Govinda Swamy. Sivaiah was the action choreographer. The film's outdoor scenes were taken at Guindy Reserve Forest in Madras.

Soundtrack 
The soundtrack was composed by T. V. Raju.

Release and reception 
Kadaladu Vadaladu was released on 9 July 1969. Reviewing the film on 25 July 1969, Rayudu AVS of Zamin Ryot criticised the film's story and screenplay while noting that only Rama Rao's performance reaches the audience expectations. The film performed well commercially in urban areas, and much stronger in rural areas.

References

External links 
 

1960s Telugu-language films
1969 films
Films about miscarriage of justice
Films directed by B. Vittalacharya
Indian swashbuckler films